Michael Copeland may refer to:

Michael Copeland (politician) (born 1954), Unionist MLA from Northern Ireland
Michael Copeland (sports executive) in Ontario, Canada